Isael da Silva Barbosa (born 13 May 1988), most commonly known as Isael, is a BrazilIan professional midfielder who plays for Saudi Arabian club Al-Jabalain.

Career

Early career
Isael was born in São Paulo, Brazil. He is a Grêmio youth product.

Krasnodar
On 31 January 2013, Isael signed an 18-month contract with FC Krasnodar. On 19 May 2014, at the expiration of his contract, he left Krasnodar.

Kairat
On 23 June 2014, Isael signed a six-month contract with FC Kairat in the Kazakhstan Premier League. On 30 July 2015, he extended his stay at Kairat until December 2018. He left Kairat at the end of his contract.

Ferencváros
On 1 February 2019, Isael signed with Ferencvárosi TC.

On 16 June 2020, he became champion with Ferencváros by beating Budapest Honvéd FC at the Hidegkuti Nándor Stadion on the 30th match day of the 2019–20 Nemzeti Bajnokság I season.

Al-Jabalain
On 29 July 2022, Isael joined Saudi First Division side Al-Jabalain.

Career statistics

Honours
Sport Recife
Campeonato Pernambucano: 2010

FC Kairat
 Kazakhstan Cup: 2014, 2015, 2017

Ferencváros
 Nemzeti Bajnokság I: 2018–19, 2019–20,2020–21

References

External links
Isael at Ogol 
Isael at Grêmio 

 

1988 births
Living people
Brazilian footballers
Brazilian expatriate footballers
Grêmio Foot-Ball Porto Alegrense players
Sport Club do Recife players
Coritiba Foot Ball Club players
Fortaleza Esporte Clube players
Associação Desportiva São Caetano players
Giresunspor footballers
C.D. Nacional players
FC Krasnodar players
FC Kairat players
Ferencvárosi TC footballers
Umm Salal SC players
Al-Jabalain FC players
Primeira Liga players
Russian Premier League players
Kazakhstan Premier League players
Nemzeti Bajnokság I players
Qatar Stars League players
Saudi First Division League players
Association football midfielders
Expatriate footballers in Turkey
Expatriate footballers in Portugal
Expatriate footballers in Russia
Expatriate footballers in Kazakhstan
Expatriate footballers in Hungary
Expatriate footballers in Qatar
Expatriate footballers in Saudi Arabia
Brazilian expatriate sportspeople in Turkey
Brazilian expatriate sportspeople in Portugal
Brazilian expatriate sportspeople in Russia
Brazilian expatriate sportspeople in Kazakhstan
Brazilian expatriate sportspeople in Hungary
Brazilian expatriate sportspeople in Qatar
Brazilian expatriate sportspeople in Saudi Arabia
Footballers from São Paulo